Tonkam is a prominent French publisher of manga and was one of the first publishers of manga in French, issuing its first titles in 1994. It was founded by Sylvie Chang and Dominique Véret with the financial assistance of a Parisian bookseller, Yu-Chi Chang. The company had some legal problems when it published New Angel; because of its hentai content was forced to retire the product from the market. In 1996, Tonkam entered into a venture with the Belgian publisher Ypnos to publish Korean manhwa, but the experience was short-lived as Ypnos closed soon after.

Dominique Véret, left his post of publishing director in the early years 2000 to found the publishing company Akata, in partnership with Delcourt.

At the end of 2005, after the death of Yu-Chi Chang, Mmes Françoise and Sylvie Chang, owners of the company, signed a contract with Delcourt which became the major actionist of the company, but the two companies kept different editorial strategies and identities. However, Tonkam could enjoy the structures and editorial presence of Delcourt, so during January 2006, Tonkam dropped its in-house distribution system, and its distribution is currently assured by Hachette.

Guy Delcourt is the current CEO.

Titles published

Titles published by Tonkam include the following:
 Adolf
 Angel/Dust
 Angel Sanctuary
 Appare Jipangu!
 Asatte Dance
 Ayashi no Ceres
 Black & White
 Black Magic
 Blue Spring
 Bokko
 Boku wo Tsutsumu Tsuki no Hikari
 Buddha
 Butsu Zone
 Cat's Eye - Rights moved to Panini Manga in 2004
 Count Cain
 Crazy Kouzu BC
 Cross Game
 Descendants of Darkness
 DNA²
 Dominion
 Dragon Quest: The Adventure of Dai
 Duck Prince
 Fairy Cube
 Fake
 Family Compo - Rights moved to Panini Manga in 2004
 Fever, la rencontre ultime
 Flame of Recca
 Frères du Japon (Nihon no Kyodai)
 Fushigi Yūgi
 Fushigi Yūgi Genbu Kaiden
 Gakuen Heaven
 Gakuen Tengoku
 Gankyu Kitan Yui
 Gantz
 Godchild
 Guuzen ga Nokosu Mono
 Gyo
 H2
 Hana-Kimi
 Hellsing
 Hellstar Remina
 Hidamari no Ki
 High School! Kimengumi
 Hikaru no Go
 Hiyoko Brand - Okusama wa Joshi Kousei
 Homunculus
 Hyper Rune
 I¨s
 I'll
  Ichi the Killer
 Ichigo 100%
 Imadoki
 Jesus
 Jin
 Joan
 JoJo's Bizarre Adventure
 Jinbē
 Kare Kano
 Kimagure Orange Road
 Kindaichi Case Files
 Kizuna: Bonds of Love
 Komorebi no Moto de - Rights moved to Panini Manga in 2004
 Koucha Ouji
 Lady Georgie
 Lawful Drug
 Love & Destroy
 Ludwig Revolution
 M
 Magical Tarurūto-kun
 Maison Ikkoku
 Miyuki-chan in Wonderland
 MW
 Phoenix
 Please Save My Earth
 Pretty Face
 Rash!! - Rights moved to Panini Manga in 2004
 RG Veda
 Rookies
 Sakura no Hanasaki Kukoro - Rights moved to Panini Manga in 2004
 Secret Chaser
 Seimaden
 Screw
 Shadow Lady
 Shiba Inu
 Short Program
 Shounentachi no ita Natsu  - Rights moved to Panini Manga in 2004
 Shumari
 Special A
 Spirit of the sun
 Tenshi no okurimono - Rights moved to Panini Manga in 2004
 The Executive's Dog
 The Crater
 The One I Love
 The Tragedy of P
 The World Reads Japan's Modern Literature
 Tigre et Dragon
 Tokyo Babylon
 Tomie
 Tough
 Trigun
 Trigun Maximum
 Uzumaki
 Vagabond
 Video Girl Ai
 Wish
 X
 Yamada Taro Monogatari
 Zetman
 Zetsuai 1989

External links
 Editions Tonkam Official Site 
 

Publishing companies established in 1994
Manga distributors
Book publishing companies of France
Manhua distributors
1994 establishments in France